The Prophecy II is a 1998 American fantasy-action-horror film and the second installment in The Prophecy series. Christopher Walken reprises his role as the Archangel Gabriel. It was directed by Greg Spence and written by Spence and Matthew Greenberg.

Plot
Lucifer (Guri Weinberg) ejects Gabriel from Hell, claiming the War of Heaven isn't his to fight and Hell isn't big enough for both of them. Gabriel's new mission is to prevent the birth of a child, a nephilim, the offspring of an angel and a human. The coming of this child, said to precede reconciliation between the warring factions in heaven, has been prophesied by Thomas Daggett, now a monk. The child's conception takes place when Valerie, a nurse, is seduced by an attractive stranger (the angel Danyael) whom she hit with her car. She finds a few days later that she is pregnant.

Gabriel attempts to find the whereabouts of the child from Daggett, but kills him when he refuses to help. When Danyael kills members of Gabriel's army of angels, Gabriel instead employs the assistance of a teenage girl (Izzy) who has just committed suicide with her boyfriend. Gabriel keeps her alive to help him in his search for Valerie (despite his powers as an angel, he is completely naive about technology, and is unable to drive a car or work a computer and has her use her computer skills to find her and drive him around).

Gabriel's war against Danyael and the other angels climaxes in a battle in Eden, now an industrial wasteland. Danyael and Izzy are killed, but Valerie defeats Gabriel by seizing him and jumping from a building, confident that God will protect her as He told her He would (she reveals that Gabriel is unable to hear His voice as he simply does not listen); she is indeed unharmed, but Gabriel is impaled on a spike. As punishment, Gabriel is turned into a human by Michael. Valerie raises the child by herself, accepting the risk that the angels may come for her. The film ends with Gabriel as a derelict; a face in the sky and ominous clouds show that the war in Heaven is not over.

Cast
 Christopher Walken as Gabriel
 Russell Wong as Danyael
 Jennifer Beals as Valerie Rosales
 Brittany Murphy as Isabelle "Izzy"
 Nicki Micheaux as Detective Kriebel
 Eric Roberts as Michael
 Glenn Danzig as Danyael
 Steve Hytner as Joseph
 Bruce Abbott as Thomas Daggett
 William Prael as Rafayel
 Renee Victor as Lida Rosales
 Elizabeth Dennehy as Dr. Kathy Kimball
 Danny Strong as Julian
 J. G. Hertzler as Father William
 Michael Raimi as Danyael, Jr.

Reception
Rotten Tomatoes, a review aggregator, reports that 33% of six surveyed critics gave the film a positive review; the average rating is 4.7/10. In 1998, the Academy of Science Fiction, Fantasy and Horror Films rated the film as "The Year's Most Suspenseful Thriller", and Cinefantastique praised the film for being "Intense…Action Packed! Walken Steals the Show!" TV Guide rated it 1/5 stars and called it "a dull and cheap-looking direct-to-video sequel". Nathan Rabin of The A.V. Club wrote, "While at times amusing, and far from unwatchable, The Prophecy IIs quirky strengths can't compensate for the fact that it's about as frightening as your average episode of Psi Factor." Robert Sellers of the Radio Times rated it 2/5 stars and wrote, "But where the original boasted some good, offbeat ideas, this quickly degenerates into just another dumb chase movie." Witney Seibold of CraveOnline wrote that the sequel suffers from overfamiliarity and thus becomes "a pretty rote action thriller". Nicholas Sylvain of DVD Verdict wrote, "If you aren't a Walken fan, then you have my sympathies, because there's not much else here for you."

See also
 List of films about angels

References

External links
 
 
 

1998 films
1998 horror films
American fantasy films
Direct-to-video horror films
1990s English-language films
The Prophecy (film series)
Direct-to-video sequel films
Dimension Films films
American supernatural horror films
Films produced by Joel Soisson
1990s American films